Brigade Cricket Club is a cricket club in Derry, Northern Ireland, playing in North West Senior League 1.

Founded in 1909 and originally known as Church Lads' Brigade, the club adopted its current name in 1923. The club's first ground was at the Brandywell, and moved to its current ground in 1921, having played for a year in 1920 in Black's Field, Glendermott Road.

Honours
Irish Senior Cup: 2
1996, 1999
Ulster Cup: 4
2001, 2003, 2012, 2016
North West Senior League: 15 (1 shared)
1930 (shared), 1936, 1937, 1944, 1945, 1971, 1973, 1983, 2001, 2002, 2004, 2006, 2007, 2011, 2019, 2020
North West Senior Cup: 14
1921, 1930, 1939, 1943, 1946, 1972, 1973, 1977, 1991, 1998, 2010, 2018, 2019, 2021

References

External links
Brigade Cricket Club

Sport in Derry (city)
Cricket clubs in Northern Ireland
North West Senior League members
1909 establishments in Ireland
Cricket clubs in County Londonderry